The United June Movement (Turkish: Birleşik Haziran Hareketi, BHH) was a political coalition bringing together left-wing, communist and socialist parties, Marxist–Leninist political organizations, independent individuals and various left-wing non-governmental organizations in Turkey.

BHH was defined as anti-capitalist, anti-imperialist, anti-fascist and anti-reactionary political alliance by the founders of the movement.

In February 2015, HDP honorary president and HDK co-spokesperson Ertuğrul Kürkçü approached the United June Movement with a proposal to contest the June 2015 general election as a joint list.

See also
Peoples' Democratic Congress
Peoples' United Revolutionary Movement

References

External links
 

2014 establishments in Turkey
Defunct communist parties in Turkey
Defunct left-wing political party alliances
Defunct political party alliances in Turkey
Far-left politics in Turkey
Political parties with year of disestablishment missing
Political parties established in 2014
Popular fronts
Turkey